Gisela Dulko and Maria Kirilenko were the defending champions, but Kirilenko did not compete this year to only focusing in the singles tournament. Dulko teamed up with Yan Zi and had to withdraw in the quarterfinal match against Natalie Grandin and Camille Pin.

Vania King and Jelena Kostanić won the title by defeating Chan Yung-jan and Chuang Chia-jung 7–6(7–2), 5–7, 6–2 in the final.

Seeds

Draw

Draw

Qualifying draw

Seeds

Qualifiers
  Antonia Matic /  Caroline Wozniacki

Lucky losers

Draw

Raluca Olaru and Abigail Spears withdrew from the qualifying competition, with Spears citing personal reasons.

References
 Main and Qualifying Draws

2006 Japan Open Tennis Championships